The Passengers is a 1999 French drama film directed by Jean-Claude Guiguet. It was screened in the Un Certain Regard section at the 1999 Cannes Film Festival.

Cast
 Fabienne Babe - Anna
 Philippe Garziano - Pierre
 Bruno Putzulu - David
 Stéphane Rideau - Marco
 Gwenaëlle Simon - Isabelle (as Gwénaëlle Simon)
 Véronique Silver - La Narratrice
 Jean-Christophe Bouvet - Le Voyageur
 Marie Rousseau - Christine
 Laurent Aduso - La Malade
 Thomas Badek - Le Golden Boy et le Médecin
 Emmanuel Bolève - Le jeune homme
 Jean-Paul Bordes - Le Prêtre
 Serge Bozon - Un Voyageur
 Sébastien Charles - Raoul
 Marie-Christine Damiens - Marie

References

External links

1999 films
French drama films
1990s French-language films
1999 drama films
Films directed by Jean-Claude Guiguet
1990s French films